The 1975 Missouri Tigers football team was an American football team that represented the University of Missouri in the Big Eight Conference (Big 8) during the 1975 NCAA Division I football season. The team compiled a 6–5 record (3–4 against Big 8 opponents), finished in a tie for fifth place in the Big 8, and outscored opponents by a combined total of 282 to 241. Al Onofrio was the head coach for the fifth of seven seasons. The team played its home games at Faurot Field in Columbia, Missouri.

The team's statistical leaders included running back Tony Galbreath with 777 rushing yards, quarterback Steve Pisarkiewicz with 1,792 passing yards and 1,732 yards of total offense, wide receiver Henry Marshall with 945 receiving yards, and placekicker Tim Gibbons with 72 points scored.

Schedule

Roster
TE Charley Douglass
QB Pete Woods

References

Missouri
Missouri Tigers football seasons
Missouri Tigers football